Nikola Kovačević (born 14 April 1994) is a Serbian football midfielder who plays for Radnički Kragujevac.

References

External links
 
 Nikola Kovačević Stats at utakmica.rs

1994 births
Living people
Sportspeople from Kragujevac
Association football defenders
Serbian footballers
Serbian expatriate footballers
FK Radnički 1923 players
FK Radnički Niš players
FK Vojvodina players
FK Spartak Subotica players
FK Spartaks Jūrmala players
FK Radnik Surdulica players
FK Mačva Šabac players
FK Novi Pazar players
Serbian SuperLiga players
Latvian Higher League players
Serbian expatriate sportspeople in Latvia
Expatriate footballers in Latvia